The Siebengemeinden were seven Jewish communities located in Kismarton (today Eisenstadt, Austria) and its surrounding area. The groups are known as Sheva Kehillot in Hebrew.

History
The communities were established after 1670, when Paul I, 1st Prince Esterházy of Galántha accepted the Jews that had been expelled from Vienna by Leopold I.

The Siebengemeinden (now in Austrian Burgenland, which formerly belonged to Hungary) were composed of communities in Kismarton, Nagymarton (Mattersburg, old German name: Mattersdorf), Kabold (Kobersdorf), Lakompak (Lackenbach), Boldogasszony (Frauenkirchen), Köpcsény (Kittsee), and Sopronkeresztúr (Deutschkreutz, Hebrew: Tzeilem, Yiddish: Zelem). All together there numbered around 3,000 Jews, who were predominantly of Orthodox Jewish persuasion.

The most pious lived in Nagymarton and Sopronkeresztúr, where there were important yeshivas. Another community developed in Nagymarton under the leadership of the great Rabbi Moses Sofer (1763–1839). All seven communities fell victim to the persecution of the Jews under the government of the National Socialists.

People 
 Samson Wertheimer (16581724), chief rabbi of Hungary and Moravia, and rabbi of Kismarton
 Moses Sofer, rabbi of Nagymarton, 1798 - 1806
 Joseph Joachim (1831 - 1907),  violinist, conductor, composer from Köpcsény

Data from the 1910 Census 

 Alsókismartonhegy (Unterberg, now part of Eisenstadt): 276 Jews (79.3% of the town or village)
 Lakompak (Lackenbach): 464 Jews (27.8%)
 Kabold (Kobersdorf): 256 Jews (20.2%)
 Sopronkeresztúr (Deutschkreutz): 621 Jews (18.6%) 
 Boldogasszony (Frauenkirchen): 412 Jews (15.1%)
 Nagymarton (Mattersdorf, now Mattersburg): 511 Jews (13.5%)
 Kismarton (Eisenstadt): 168 Jews (5.5%)
 Felsőkismartonhegy (Oberberg, now part of Eisenstadt): 58 Jews (4.4%)
 Köpcsény (Kittsee): 92 Jews (2.9%)

See also 
 Kiryat Mattersdorf
 History of the Jews in Hungary
 Jewish history of Slovakia
 Jewish history of Austria

References

Further reading 
Johannes Reiss (ed.): Aus den Sieben-Gemeinden. Ein Lesebuch über Juden im Burgenland. Eisenstadt 1997. 
Hugo Gold (ed.): Gedenkbuch der untergegangenen Judengemeinden des Burgenlandes. Tel Aviv 1970.

External links 
 SHEBA' ḲEHILLOT (Jewish Encyclopedia)

 
Burgenland
Jewish Hungarian history
Jewish Austrian history
Jewish communities in Hungary
Jewish communities in Austria
Holocaust locations in Hungary
Oberlander Jews